Bouskoura is a city in Morocco, situated in the suburb area of Casablanca. In year 2020 it had a population of 138,699 inhabitants, up from 58,312 inhabitants in the 2004 census. It has an important industrial zone.

References

Populated places in Nouaceur Province
Municipalities of Morocco